The songs and yells of the University of Trinity College in the University of Toronto are diverse. Many of the songs seem archaic and bizarre to outsiders, but are a cherished part of daily life in the college, and are of diverse and often obscure origins. The predominant sources are twofold: some are inherited directly from the Oxbridge universities in England, while many of the more recent have their roots in periods and events in Trinity's own history.

College songs

Met'Agona Stephanos
The college song, Met'Agona Stephanos, has been rewritten so many times that it now includes both Greek and Latin verses. The first Latin verse, Nimium Cervisi, was an epinikion, a victory ode sung after the annual steeplechase run on St. Simon and St. Jude's Day, 28 October. It seems to originate from about 1895, while the rest of the song is at least twenty years older, possibly from as early as 1863, it having been the song of the Trinity company in the era of the Fenian raids. Reports that the Trinity College company, deployed in reserve as part of the Canadian contingent during the Niagara raid, mistakenly fired into a retreating company from University College are apocryphal.  Alternatively, Reed writes in his history of the college that there is some indication that the original Greek verses of the song were brought from a German university by a member of the faculty in the early years of the college.  "Sanctum Hildam canimus" is the St. Hilda's verse and therefore cannot date from earlier than 1888.  The verse beginning with "En Pater Episkopon" is, so far as is presently known, attested only in the 1968 edition of Trinlife.  Like countless other Latin verses written throughout the history of the college, this verse is no longer part of the song currently sung by Trinity students.  The verse beginning with "Chaire, kosme kambrias" was written in honour of Provost Seeley, who held the post from 1945 until 1957.  Although this verse survived for decades after Seeley's term ended, it is also not in the version of the song that is sung in the college at present.  However, this verse has the distinction of being the only known Greek verse to have been added later than the original three.

(Tune:O Tannenbaum)

The Provost's Kindergarten

This song is thought to date from the 1930s as it is a satire of many of the fellows and staff of the college of that period.  It is attested in the 1947 edition of the Trinity and St. Hilda's Colleges Song Book.

Behold amid the clouds of smoke that everywhere abound,
And crowds and crowds of prancing dogs that follow him around,
Appears the Prov. with solemn stride from Cambria's learned reaches
And deals to all who chance to fail unsympathetic speeches.

Chorus: 
Babies, children, everybody come, 
Join the Provost's kindergarten, make yourselves at home, 
Kindly check your rattles and your cradles at the door
And the Prov'll make you happier than you ever were before.

Dean Lyndon is an Oxford man from far across the sea, 
And how he fills our lecture rooms with floods of orat'ry; 
He seems to be a masterpiece of culture, poise and wit, 
And we love to hear his sermons paraphrasing Holy Writ.

Mossie Kirkwood spends her time in making Saints behave, 
She lectures too in English to many that are brave, 
Her clothes are quite spectacular-but that we could forgive
If only she would let the Saints discover how to "live".

Hicks has two pairs of spectacles so French he can pursue, 
While one he waves aloft in air, the others read the news, 
He wears a suit that must have been in fashion in the Ark, 
And quizzes us from time to time to find how much we mark.

Archdeacon J. B. Fotheringham, a Scotsman to the core,
Is full of communistic thoughts and homiletic lore.
He reads the sermon outlines that we hand in every week
And teaches in his lectures how a clergyman should speak.

For Theologs an Acting Dean, for Sciences a master, 
Prof. Fielding makes his stately way and never talks much faster; 
With dry remark and pondered phrase and glancing quizzically, 
He rather hopes that some of us may pass eventually.

Doc. Kirkwood, Clerk of Convocat, a staid old married man, 
He'd like to do a lot for us but don't know if he can, 
In spite of his exterior so silent and so grim, 
The Saints all love him very much, in fact one married him.

Inhabiting the Angel's Roost in quiet solitude, 
Economical of voice, Mr. Ashley is Subdued. 
His non-committal speeches of a humanistic tone
Are usually heard in the front two rows alone.

There's one professor on the staff of literary fame; 
Through writing modern novels he has made himself a name, 
And so as a result, a famous author he is styled
Although-and not remarkable-he's but a little Child.

Prof. Adams, the librarian, keeps locked the stockroom door
For fear instead of from the Tomes we'd study on the floor; 
His lecture on the lib'ry sends freshmen all to sleep, 
And he grows quite irritated when the books we try to keep.

Mr. Strathy is the Bursar and a man of mickle might; 
When we hear his tread approaching us we scramble out of sight, 
Alone at the High Table he appears without a gown
For even all the sophomores will tremble at his frown.

Now Barker heads the English staff and also the Review; 
He deprecates our budding wit and thinks our brains too few; 
With pompadour and specs and pipe and famed Miltonic sneer
He fills the Essay-books and Saints with pencil marks and fear.

Professor Kennett teaches us of Boileau and Racine
And Natural Romanticists (whatever that may mean). 
You'll know him by his stature and his volubility, 
And wonder such a flood of French could come from U.B.C.

Grube is an Englishman with instincts wholly Greek; 
His pre-socratic pompadour is very slick and sleek; 
His proses are the nightmare of our academic life, 
Although we're strong suspicious that they're written by his wife.

Prof. Lewis is a stately don, quite pensive and demure, 
Who tells us what the Germans think of Art and Liter'ture. 
Although he's near perfection we would make just one complaint, 
And that's the way in which he fraternises with the Saints.

Garrett is Romantic, with anxiety to please; 
He'll gladly tell you all about the flowers, birds and bees. 
His Chaucer is so torrid, his Old English cannot fail, 
We all have marked the glee with which he reads "The Miller's Tale".

Here's to good old Hodgins, whose name is Auntie Lloyd; 
His mental turns and back-flips are surly anthropoid! 
Though mother to the Harrier team, a bach'lor he will stay, 
And tell us bedtime stories about Anna Hathaway.

Our Robert in the Porter's Lodge for every duty waits, 
From selling gowns and Christmas cards, to fixing up blind dates. 
He keeps the College on its feet, our troubles on the shelf, 
Why he's just as indispensable as Trinity itself!

The Saints' Serenade

This song would supposedly have been sung by Men of College outside of the St. Hilda's residences at various occasions throughout the year when such was customary.  It is attested in the 1947 edition of the Trinity and St. Hilda's Colleges Song Book, there the authorship is attributed to one J. A. Seabrook of the year '33.  Since the desegregation of residences in 2005 such serenades have died out.

(Tune:There is a Tavern in the Town)

We come, O Saints, to serenade,
So listen to this song we've made.
Rise up!  Rise up from your little trundle beds,
Awake!  Awaken from the dead.

You see our hearts are filled with sighs;
If we had wings we'd upward fly
And bring you down to join our happy band
Far out of reach of Mossie's hands.

We all will take a Saint to wife;
Then we'll be happy all our life:
O gentle Saints we'll keep you safe from harm
If you'll stretch out your maiden arms.

The Saints they lead a sloppy life,
They eat their green peas with a knife;
And once a month they take a scrub
And leave the water in the tub.

You are the fairest of the fair.
If you don't love us we don't care;
If you, O Saints, won't answer to our call
We'll sing our songs to Whitney Hall.

The Soph-Frosh Smoker

This song was to be sung at the annual Soph-Frosh smoker, about which little is known aside from what may be inferred from the lyrics below.  Like the serenade above, it is attested in the 1947 edition of the Trinity and St. Hilda's Colleges Song Book, where the authorship is attributed to one J. D. L. Taylor of 4T9.  Much like the institution at which it was sung, this song is no longer sung in the college.

(Tune:Clementine)

In a basement, in a cellar,
Anywhere that's out of sight,
It's the Soph-Frosh yearly smoker
Roaring on through half the night.

Chorus: 
Come and join us, sophs and freshmen, 
Join our cheerful little song;
Sing it loud and shake the rafters, 
Make it hearty, loud and long.

Most refreshments served are liquid
But complaints are very rare.
From the Tapeworm to the Provost
Everyone enjoys the fare.

Baritones are very welcome, 
Tenors too we like to hear,
With the basses intermingled
Over many mugs of beer.

Holy Joes appear in numbers, 
Noting scenes which cause them pain;
But it's really quite amazing
All the bottles they can drain.

For this noble institution, 
Only one thing do we fear-
That it won't be as successful
When it comes again next year.

The Trinity Man and the Saint

This song is attested in the 1947 edition of the Trinity and St. Hilda's Colleges Song Book, there the authorship is attributed to one S. Agnew of the year 4T9.  Nothing else is known about this song.

(Tune:Mademoiselle from Armentières)

A Trinity man and a Saint one day,
Glory be!
Were enjoying themselves in their own little way,
Glory be!
With a forty-ounce crock and some crumpets and tea
They sat in the Quad. in such ecstasy,
Met'Agona Glory be!

They each had been eating the Trinity dish,
Woe is me!
And washing it down with a sizeable swish,
Woe is me!
But the lab. alcohol unexpectedly
Combusted with the crumpets and tea.
Met'Agona, Woe is me!

When the smoke cleared away and the Quad. came to light,
R.I.P.
The onlookers turned epileptic with fright,
R.I.P.
For the Saint and the Sinner appeared to be gone
To the bosom of Father Episcopon!
Met'Agona, - R.I.P.

College Yells

Salterrae

Who are we?
We are the Salt of the Earth,
So give ear to us!
No new ideas shall ever come near to us!
Orthodox! Catholic!
Crammed with Divinity!
Damn the dissenters,
Hurrah for old Trinity!

This yell, by far the most common of all Trinity yells, may be heard by Trinity students at any number of annual events.  It is most generally used when Trinity students are interacting as a group with the other colleges of the U of T or the rest of Toronto.  ‘Who are we?' is shouted to prompt the rest of the cheer.  First years are not permitted to prompt this cheer.

Nimium Cervisii

Nimium Cervisii
Trinity University
Red and Black shall ever cry
T-RI-NI-TY
T-R-I-N-I-T-Y
Trinity!

This yell, attested in the 1947 edition of the Trinity and St. Hilda's Colleges Song Book, is long since defunct.  The yell is believed to have its origins in the late 19th century, when the institution was formally known as Trinity University.  The first line, meaning ‘too much spirits' is taken from one of the Latin verses of Met'Agona Stephanos, the college song.

Oh Really, Oh Rally

Oh really, oh rally
How beastly, how jolly
Trinity, Trinity,
Rah…

This yell, which is usually recited in an English accent, is a parody of the college's British heritage.  The yell is generally recited in a blasé tone with a wave of the wrist accompanying the last line.

Crumpets and Tea

Crumpets and Tea
Crumpets and Tea
We're from Trinity,
Crumpets and Tea…

This yell is usually recited in a twee accent, also parodying the college's English heritage.

References

songs and yells of the University of Trinity College
Student culture in Canada
Traditions by university or college
University folklore